The world's largest recorded music markets are listed annually by the International Federation of the Phonographic Industry (IFPI). The ranking is based on retail value (rather than units) each market generates respectively per year; retail value generated by each market varies from year to year. As all financial data is given in US dollars, annual rates of change for all countries other than the United States are heavily influenced by exchange rate fluctuations, as well as by actual changes in revenue in local currency terms.

It is important to note that the information presented in this page only accounts for revenue generated from the recorded music industry (recorded music and auxiliary revenues generated by these recordings), and is not reflective of the entirety of the music industry, including sectors such as publishing, live music, etc.

The United States has remained the biggest market for recorded music in IFPI history, except in 2010 when Japan topped the list. The largest Asian music market, Japan has always stayed within the top two. The other largest music markets by region include the United Kingdom in Europe, Australia in Oceania, and Brazil in South America. Meanwhile, Germany, France, and Canada have consistently appeared among the top ten music markets in IFPI history. Other countries historically having made into the top ten include Italy, Netherlands, South Korea, Spain, China, Russia, and Mexico.

IFPI annual data

2021

Source: Figures within the table are based on IFPI Global Music Report 2022.

2020

Source: Figures within the table are based on IFPI Global Music Report 2021.

2019

Source: Figures within the table are based on IFPI Global music report 2020.

2018

Source: Figures within the table are based on IFPI Global music report 2019.

2017

Source: Figures within the table are based on IFPI Global music report 2018.

2016

Source: Figures within the table are based on IFPI Grobal music report 2017.

2015

Source: Figures within the table are based on IFPI Grobal music report 2016.

2014

Source: Figures within the table are based on IFPI 2014 annual report.

2013

Source: Figures within the table are based on IFPI 2013 annual report.

2012 

Source: Figures within the table are based on IFPI 2012 annual report.

2011 

Source: Figures within the table are based on IFPI 2011 annual report.

2010 

Source: Figures within the table are based on IFPI 2010 annual report. Total units figures are derived by addition of figures reported by referenced sources.

2009 

Source: Figures within the table are based on IFPI 2009 annual report. Total units figures are derived by addition of figures reported by referenced sources.

2008 

Source: Figures within the table are based on IFPI 2008 annual report, except where noted below. Total units figures are derived by addition of figures reported by referenced sources.

Notes

  Ireland's population figure is based on the CIA's 2010 estimation due to the missing information on the IFPI 2008 report.
  Iceland's population figure is based on the CIA's 2010 estimation due to the missing information on the IFPI 2008 report.

2007 

Source: Figures within the table are based on IFPI 2007 annual report, except where noted below. Total units figures are derived by addition of figures reported by referenced sources.

Notes

  Croatia's, Venezuela's, Bulgaria's, Iceland's, Uruguay's, Ecuador's and Peru's population figures are based on IFPI 2008 annual report due to the missing information on the IFPI 2007 report.

2006 

Source: Figures within the table are based on IFPI 2006 annual report, except where noted below. Total units figures are derived by addition of figures reported by referenced sources.

Notes

  Venezuela's, Central America's population figures are based on the IFPI 2004 report due to not having the information on IFPI 2006 report.
  Slovakia's population figure is based on the CIA's 2010 estimation due to not having the information on the IFPI 2008 report.
  Uruguay's, Ecuador's and Peru's population figures are based on IFPI 2008 report due to not having the information on IFPI 2006 report.

2005 

Source: Figures within the table are based on IFPI 2005 annual report, except where noted below. Total units figures are derived by addition of figures reported by referenced sources.

Notes

  Ukraine's, Colombia's, Venezuela's, Central America's population figures are based on IFPI 2004 annual report due to the missing information on the IFPI 2005 report.
  Slovakia's population figure is based on the CIA's 2010 estimation due to not having the information on the IFPI 2005 report.
  Paraguay's population figure is based on the CIA's 2010 estimation due to not having the information on the IFPI 2005 report.
  Uruguay's, Ecuador's population figures are based on IFPI 2008 annual report due to the missing information on the IFPI 2005 report.
  Egypt's population figure is based on the CIA's 2010 estimation due to not having the information on the IFPI 2005 report.

2004 

Source: Figures within the table are based on IFPI 2004 annual report, except where noted below. Total units figures are derived by addition of figures reported by referenced sources.

Notes

  Note that the figures in the column of Total units for some markets may be higher than what the combined total from the columns of Singles, CDs, DVD might represent. This is due to the missing sales of Digital Downloads, Cassette Albums and VHS Cassettes which are not included on IFPI 2004 report provided by RIAJ.
  Note that the figures posted in the column of Total units for some markets may be lower than what the combined total from the columns of Singles, CDs, DVDs might represent. This is because the columns of Singles, CDs, DVDs represent shipped units, whereas the column of Total units represent sold units.

2003 

Source: Figures within the table are based on IFPI 2004 annual report, except where noted below. Total units figures are derived by addition of figures reported by referenced sources.

2002 

Source: Figures within the table are based on IFPI 2004 annual report, except where noted below. Total units figures are derived by addition of figures reported by referenced sources.

1998

Source: Figures within the table are based on the IFPI annual report and reported by Billboard.

1997

Source: Figures within the table are based on the IFPI annual report and reported by Billboard.

1996

Source: Figures within the table are based on the IFPI annual report and reported by Billboard.

1991

Source: Figures within the table are based on the IFPI annual report and reported by Billboard.

Statistics

See also

References

Largest recorded music markets
Largest recorded music markets
Largest recorded music markets
Recorded music